The 1981–82 All-Ireland Senior Club Hurling Championship was the 12th staging of the All-Ireland Senior Club Hurling Championship, the Gaelic Athletic Association's premier inter-county club hurling tournament. The championship ended on 16 May 1982.

Ballyhale Shamrocks were the defending champions, however, they failed to qualify for the championship.

On 16 May 1982, James Stephens won the championship following a 3-13 to 3-08 defeat of Mount Sion in the All-Ireland final. This was their second All-Ireland title and their first in six years.

Results

Connacht Senior Club Hurling Championship

Final

Leinster Senior Club Hurling Championship

First round

Quarter-finals

Semi-finals

Final

Munster Senior Club Hurling Championship

Quarter-finals

Semi-final

Final

Ulster Senior Club Hurling Championship

Final

All-Ireland Senior Club Hurling Championship

Semi-finals

Final

References

1980 in hurling
1981 in hurling
All-Ireland Senior Club Hurling Championship